Feetham is an English surname that may refer to
Daniel Feetham (born 1967), Gibraltarian politician and lawyer 
Richard Feetham (1874–1965), South African lawyer, politician and judge 
Feetham Function Committee in India
John Feetham (disambiguation) – multiple people
William Feetham, English rugby league footballer who played in the 1890s

English-language surnames